Darse Earle Crandall Jr. (born 1962) is a United States Navy vice admiral who serves as the 45th Judge Advocate General of the Navy since August 18, 2021. He most recently served as the Deputy Judge Advocate General of the Navy and Commander of the Naval Legal Service Command from September 12, 2018 to August 18, 2021.

Early life and education
Raised in Elgin, Illinois, Crandall earned a B.A. degree in economics from Northwestern University in 1984. He served aboard  and USS Lockwood (FF-1064) before being selected for the Law Education Program. Crandall received his J.D. degree from the Georgetown University Law Center in 1992 and his LL.M. degree in international law from George Washington University in 1999.

Personal life 
Crandall is the son of Darse Earle Crandall Sr., who was a Navy Supply Corps officer. His younger sister Amy Beth Crandall is the wife of fellow Navy admiral Frank D. Whitworth.

Crandall married Barbara A. Puckett on December 20, 1986 in Lucas County, Ohio.

Awards and decorations

References

External links

1962 births
Living people
Place of birth missing (living people)
People from Elgin, Illinois
Northwestern University alumni
Georgetown University Law Center alumni
American military lawyers
George Washington University Law School alumni
Recipients of the Legion of Merit
United States Navy admirals
Recipients of the Defense Superior Service Medal
Judge Advocates General of the United States Navy